The 1921 Dayton football team was an American football team that represented the University of Dayton as an independent during the 1921 college football season. Under head coaches Charley Way and Bud Talbott, the team compiled a 1–7–1 record.

Schedule

References

Dayton
Dayton Flyers football seasons
Dayton football